Darlene Rodriguez (née Pomales)  is an American journalist and co-anchor of Today in New York on WNBC. Rodriguez became co-anchor of the show in July 2003 after serving as a reporter for WNBC and then co-anchor of Weekend Today in New York.

Rodriguez has also served as a fill-in newsreader for Ann Curry and later, Natalie Morales on The Today Show on NBC. Prior to working for WNBC, she was a general assignment reporter for WCBS Newsradio 88 for four years, and worked as a reporter for the BronxNet cable television network. 
 
Rodriguez, who is of Puerto Rican ancestry is a native of the Bronx. She is a 1988 graduate of Christopher Columbus High School in that borough, and a 1992 graduate of the University of Miami with a degree in broadcast journalism and political science. While in college, Rodriguez was instrumental in creating various local cable news programs which focused on cross-cultural cuisines.  Her passion for cooking and crocheting (which she learned as a child) still occupy most of her free time. She lives currently in Croton-on-Hudson, New York.

See also
 New Yorkers in journalism

References

External links
Darlene Rodriguez on NBC New York

Darlene Rodriguez Photo from zimbio

Living people
NBC News people
Television anchors from New York City
People from the Bronx
University of Miami alumni
American people of Puerto Rican descent
American reporters and correspondents
Puerto Rican journalists
People from Croton-on-Hudson, New York
1970 births